Cultural mapping, also known as cultural resource mapping or cultural landscape mapping, refers to a wide range of research techniques and tools used to "map" distinct peoples' tangible and intangible cultural assets within local landscapes around the world.  Institutions (including UNESCO) concerned about safeguarding cultural diversity use the term.

Cultural mapping is also used to describe the use of research methods, tools, and techniques to identify, describe, portray, promote, and plan future use of particular regions' or cities' combined cultural assets and resources:

Cultural mapping is an emerging interdisciplinary field in which a range of perspectives are used as:

See also
 Cultural landscape
 Participatory GIS

References

Cultural geography
Cartography